Daviot railway station served the village of Daviot, Highland, Scotland, from 1897 to 1965 on the Inverness and Aviemore Direct Railway.

History 
The station opened on 19 July 1897 by the Highland Railway. It was the terminus of the line until  opened in 1898. On the northbound platform was the station building and to the southwest was the goods yard. There were two signal boxes: one to the north which was built, but never opened. The other signal box was to the south in between the goods sidings. It was relocated slightly to the north in 1952. The station closed on 3 May 1965. The signal box closed in 1969. Only the platforms remain.

References

External links 

Disused railway stations in Highland (council area)
Railway stations in Great Britain opened in 1897
Railway stations in Great Britain closed in 1965
1897 establishments in Scotland
1965 disestablishments in Scotland
Beeching closures in Scotland
Former Highland Railway stations